Schnorr is a German surname. Notable people with this surname include the following:

 Claus P. Schnorr (born 1943), German mathematician and cryptographer
 Donna Schnorr (died 1984), victim of American serial killer Brian Dugan
 Veit Hans Schnorr, later Veit Hans Schnorr von Carolsfeld (1644–1715), German iron and cobalt magnate, ancestor of the Schnorr von Carolsfeld family
 Adolf Schnorr (born 1883)  German businessman. Founder of Adolf Schnorr GmbH, manufacturer of Disc Springs
Schnorr von Carolsfeld
 Julius Schnorr von Carolsfeld (1794–1872), German painter; younger son of Veit Hanns Schnorr von Carolsfeld
 Ludwig Ferdinand Schnorr von Carolsfeld (1788–1853), German artist; elder son of Veit Hanns Schnorr von Carolsfeld
 Ludwig Schnorr von Carolsfeld (1836–1865), German Heldentenor and creator of the role of Tristan; son of Julius Schnorr von Carolsfeld
 Veit Hanns Schnorr von Carolsfeld (1764–1841), German portraitist
 Malvina Garrigues, later Malvina Schnorr von Carolsfeld (1825–1904), Danish-born German operatic soprano; wife of Ludwig Schnorr von Carolsfeld

German-language surnames